Phyllida Ashley Everingham (née Phyllida Ashley; 1894 — 1975) was an American pianist who rose to fame after World War I.

Life 
Ashley — born and raised in Berkeley, California, whose mother and grandmother had already been pianists, had her first piano lessons with her mother, and played for Ignacy Jan Paderewski when she was five. She studied with Fanny Bloomfield-Zeisler and in New York with Paderewski's pupil Sigismond Stojowski. She then worked as a silent film musician and church organist, and made her debut as a concert pianist at the Aeolian Hall.

On August 18, 1917, Ashley married surgeon John Summer Everingham (1885 — 1959), with whom she would share two children, Anne (born 6 April, 1919) and Patricia (born 17 September, 1924). After the First World War, she settled again in San Francisco with her husband. By 1920, Ashley had become  popular as a pianist in the east. There she appeared twice a week on a radio show and went on concert tours along the west coast. Her daughter Anne Everingham Adams became known as a harpist.

Reference

Further reading 
 Wenonah Milton Govea: Nineteenth- and twentieth-century harpists: a bio-critical sourcebook, Greenwood Publishing Group, 1995, S. 3–4
 Joseph Herter: Zygmunt Stojowski: life and music, Figueroa Press, 2007, S. 73

1894 births
1975 deaths
20th-century American pianists
American women pianists
20th-century American women musicians
20th-century American musicians
People from Berkeley, California